General Sir Archibald Rice Cameron of Locheil,  (28 August 1870 – 18 June 1944) was a British Army General during the 1930s.

Military career
Educated at Haileybury College and the Royal Military College, Sandhurst, Arichibald Cameron was commissioned into the Black Watch as a second lieutenant on 1 March 1890, promoted to lieutenant on 3 August 1892, and to captain on 6 October 1899. He was appointed adjutant in the 2nd battalion in April 1900, and with the battalion took part in the Second Boer War between 1899 and 1902, during which he received a brevet promotion as major on 29 November 1900 (gazetted in the April 1901 South Africa Honours list). Following the end of this war he left Point Natal for British India on the SS Ionian in October 1902 with other officers and men of his battalion, which after arrival in Bombay was stationed in Sialkot in Umballa in Punjab. He returned to South Africa to become Military Secretary to the Governor of the Cape of Good Hope from 1904 to 1907.

He served in the First World War, initially as a GSO2 with the 5th Division from August 1914 until March 1915, and later GSO1, still with the 5th Division, from March−October 1915. Promoted to brigadier-general, he became Brigadier-General General Staff (BGGS) for X Corps, holding this position until July 1918 and, after serving briefly as an additional BGGS with the Fourth Army, he was made BGGS with the British Armies in France.

In 1922 he became General Officer Commanding Northern Ireland District.

In 1925 he was appointed Director of Staff Duties at the War Office moving on to be General Officer Commanding 4th Division in 1927, a post he held until 1931. He was appointed General Officer Commanding-in-Chief of Scottish Command in 1933 and in 1936 also became Governor of Edinburgh Castle; he retired in 1937.

Family
Archibald Cameron never married. His niece Marion Eleanora Cameron married Harold Salvesen, a British businessman.

References

External links
 Archives catalogue for Sir Archibald Rice Cameron Collection, The Black Watch Castle & Museum, Perth, Scotland.

|-

|-
 

1870 births
1944 deaths
Knights Grand Cross of the Order of the British Empire
Knights Commander of the Order of the Bath
CMG
Black Watch officers
Graduates of the Royal Military College, Sandhurst
British Army personnel of the Second Boer War
British Army generals of World War I
British Army generals